William T. Cannady (born 1937) is an American architect who has designed over two hundred projects.  He is also a professor of architecture who has taught design to over one thousand students.

Cannady was born in Houston, Texas. He attended Thomas Jefferson High School in Port
Arthur, Texas, receiving his diploma in 1956. He attended Texas A&M College from 1956 to 1960, he received his B.Arch. from the
University of California, Berkeley in 1961, and his M.Arch. from Harvard University
in 1962.
Spouse was named Mollie Cannady. From there they had two daughters. Sarah Cannady and Lucinda Cannady. 
An architect in practice in Houston, Texas since 1965, he founded Wm. T. Cannady &
Associates, Inc. in 1972. As the firm grew its name changed to Cannady, Jackson &
Ryan and then Bricker & Cannady. Cannady and his firm have earned acclaim for a wide
range of designs for residential, religious, commercial and public facilities. Since 1964,
Cannady has been a professor of architecture at the Rice School of Architecture at Rice University.

Cannady was elected a Fellow in the American Institute of Architects in 1979. Cannady
and his firm have won over sixty design awards including two Progressive Architecture awards and two Architectural Record House awards.

Cannady earned the Boy Scouts of America Eagle Scout in 1953. He also served in the U.S. Marine Corps Reserve from 1954 to 1962, receiving an honorable discharge.

Selected Buildings 

    

St. Barnabas Episcopal Church, 1965
Cannady House I, 1972
Brochstein House, 1972
Cannady Ranch, 1982
Lovett Square Townhouses, 1979
Fayette Savings Bank, 1983
Episcopal Church of the Good Shepherd, 1981
Schulte Ranch House, 1986
Cannady House III, 1991
Northern Trust Bank, 1993
E. B. Cape Public Works Training Center, 1996
Hakeem Olajuwon House, 1996
McLean-Williams House, 2001
Houston Area Women's Center, 2001
Slade House, 2003

Writings
The Things They’ve Done: A book about the careers of selected graduates of the Rice University School of Architecture, Wm. T. Cannady, FAIA, 2008

Images

References
“45 Years: William T. Cannady, FAIA, Architect.”  Rice School of Architecture.

External links
Wm. T. Cannady, FAIA Architect (http://www.cannadyarchitect.com/)
Rice University School of Architecture (http://arch.rice.edu/modules/indexwin.php)

1937 births
Architects from Houston
Texas A&M University alumni
UC Berkeley College of Environmental Design alumni
Harvard Graduate School of Design alumni
Fellows of the American Institute of Architects
Living people
United States Marine Corps reservists
Rice University faculty